The 2021 Rancho Santa Fe Open was a professional women's tennis tournament played on outdoor hard courts. It was the eleventh edition of the tournament which was part of the 2021 ITF Women's World Tennis Tour. It took place in Rancho Santa Fe, California, United States between 11 and 17 October 2021.

Singles main-draw entrants

Seeds

 1 Rankings are as of 4 October 2021.

Other entrants
The following players received wildcards into the singles main draw:
  Hanna Chang
  Kayla Day
  Jessica Failla
  Allie Kiick

The following player received entry using a protected ranking:
  Priscilla Hon

The following player received entry as a junior exempt:
  Elsa Jacquemot

The following player received entry as a special exempt:
  Emina Bektas

The following players received entry from the qualifying draw:
  Ellie Douglas
  Haley Giavara
  Dalayna Hewitt
  Elvina Kalieva
  Ashlyn Krueger
  Maegan Manasse
  Tereza Mihalíková
  Marine Partaud

Champions

Singles

  Rebecca Peterson def.  Elvina Kalieva, 6–4, 6–0.

Doubles

  Katarzyna Kawa /  Tereza Mihalíková def.  Liang En-shuo /  Rebecca Marino, 6–3, 4–6, [10–6].

References

External links
 2021 Rancho Santa Fe Open at ITFtennis.com
 Official website

2021 ITF Women's World Tennis Tour
2021 in American tennis
October 2021 sports events in the United States
2021 in sports in California